Radlett Reform Synagogue is a synagogue in a former church building on Watling Street in Radlett, Hertfordshire, England. It is affiliated to the Movement for Reform Judaism. Its Senior Rabbi, Paul Freedman, was elected in 2015 as Chair of the Assembly of Reform Rabbis UK, succeeding Sybil Sheridan in the role.

From 1984 to 1990 Barbara Borts, born in America, was a rabbi at Radlett Reform Synagogue, making her the first woman rabbi to have a pulpit of her own in a UK Reform Judaism synagogue. She was succeeded by Rabbi Alexandra Wright, who held the pulpit from 1989 to 2003.

See also
 List of Jewish communities in the United Kingdom
 List of former synagogues in the United Kingdom
Movement for Reform Judaism

References

External links 
 Radlett Reform Synagogue website
 The Movement for Reform Judaism  
 Radlett & Bushey Reform Synagogue on JCR-UK

Reform synagogues in the United Kingdom
Religion in Hertfordshire
Radlett